Melanie 'Mel' Homer is a New Zealand radio presenter and television presenter. She currently hosts the New Zealand Radio show, Sunday Cafe on Today FM. She previously hosted Three's morning show The Café with Mike Puru and Carly Flynn from 2016 until 2020. She also previously presented the morning radio show on Mix 98.2. Homer began her career as a producer for Breakfast Radio at Classic Hits (now known as The Hits) in the late 1990s. Homer has also previously worked in Hong Kong at Radio Television Hong Kong (RTKH) from 1998 to 2004.

Career

Radio
Homer has previously been the morning radio host for New Zealand's Mix98. Before this, she previously worked for The Hits, Newstalk ZB and Radio Hauraki And Magic Talk.

Homer currently hosts the New Zealand Radio Show, Sunday Cafe on Today FM.

Television
In 2015 Homer was the host for a show on Choice TV called My Dream Room. From the start of April 2016, Homer began hosting the Three morning show The Café originally with Mike Puru until May 2020 to then with Carly Flynn from June 2020. The series finished at the end of 2020.

Personal life 
Homer spent six years in Hong Kong, from 1998 to 2004. She worked at Radio Television Hong Kong during this period. She has three children, one of whom was born in Hong Kong.

She is married to New Zealand sailmaker Andy Pilcher. They both have regularly been involved with Yacht races with their boat, the 'Kaimai Flyer'.

References

Year of birth missing (living people)
Living people
New Zealand television presenters
New Zealand radio presenters